Ajax America Women is an American women's soccer team, founded in the mid-1970s by Fred Van Soest. Fred Van Soest went to the Netherlands and spoke with the Amsterdam Football Club Ajax (AFC Ajax) and asked if he could use their name and logo for a US women's soccer team and they agreed. Ajax is historically one of the most successful clubs in the world, according to the International Federation of Football History and Statistics (IFFHS). In 1985, Ajax women's team was the first women's team to play in international companion in Brazil; they took 2nd to West Germany.  They are also the most successful team in the history of the USASA National Women's Cup, taking the title five times over a ten-year period, their most recent win being in 2007.

The team is now a member of the Women's Premier Soccer League, the second tier of women's soccer in the United States and Canada. The team plays in the South Division of the Pacific Conference, their home stadium being Nansen Field in the city of Rolling Hills Estates, California, 15 miles south of downtown Los Angeles. The team's colors are navy blue and white.

Players

Current roster

Year-by-year

Honors
 WPSL Champions
 Winners (2): 2001, 2008
 Runners-up (2): 2009, 2010
 USASA National Women's Cup
 Winners (5): 1998, 2000, 2003, 2004, 2007
 USASA National Women's Amateur
 Winners (2): 1992, 1993
2012 Las Vegas Silver Mug Champions
2013 Las Vegas Silver Mug Champions

Coaches
1996-2010 Brian Boswel
1998-2012 Kenyon Lohn 
2016 Romeo Aguinaldo
2017–Present Jack Gidney

Stadia
 Nansen Field; Rolling Hills Estates, California 2000–present

External links
 
 
 

Association football clubs established in 1975
Women's soccer clubs in California
1970s establishments in California
Soccer clubs in Los Angeles

nl:Ajax America